Geyer is a town in the district of Erzgebirgskreis, in Saxony, Germany. It has a population of about 4000.

Geography 
The town is largely surrounded by forest, with the Geyersche Wald forest to the west being owned by the town.

Geyer borders to Ehrenfriedersdorf in the north east, Tannenberg in the south east, Elterlein in the south. The town of Zwönitz is in the west, Hormersdorf to the north west and the Greifensteine area to the north.

History 
Geyer was first mentioned in official documents in 1381, although mining in the Erzgebirge area had already existed a few decades before. In 1407 Geyer was granted town privileges (Marktrecht), and 60 years later it already became a town. In 1537 the town was introduced to the Protestant Reformation. Famous Renaissance builder Hieronymus Lotter settled in Geyer in 1566.

In the 16th century mining became harder to sustain, since most of the mines started to become depleted, which produced more and more waste rock. This resulted in larger and larger cavities, which led in 1704 and in 1803 to large cave-ins in Geyer. The resulting Geyersche Binge cave-in can still be visited today.

With the decline in ore-mining in the area, Geyer (as in many other towns and villages in the Erzgebirge) turned to wooden toy manufacture - such as Schwibbogen, nutcrackers and Christmas pyramids - as well as "klöppeln" as a matter of economic survival. In the 18th and 19th centuries, the textile industry was the main source of income for Geyer. In 1888, Geyer was connected to a narrow gauge railway that was to become part of the Thumer Netz, and in 1897, the town was connected to the electrical grid.

From 1952 to 1990, Geyer was part of the Bezirk Karl-Marx-Stadt of East Germany.

Sights

Tower museum 
Between 1561 and 1564 the tower was raised with the characteristic octagonal shape. This was done to create room for the Türmerfamilie, a fire guard (and his family), in order to provide warning from the devastating and frequent conflagrations in those days. In 1952 this tower was converted into a museum, which shows on seven levels historic items related to mining and the town's life through the centuries.

Old railway station 

At the former station site, there is a historic Saxon IV K narrow gauge steam locomotive together with railroad cars on display, a reminder of the time when Geyer was part of the Thumer Netz within the narrow gauge railways in Saxony.

Geyersche Binge 

The Geyersche Binge is a collapsed ore mine caused by fire-setting (a Binge is a mining sink-hole). The first cave-in was caused in 1704, and was followed by several others over the years. The last collapse was on 11 May 1803 and led to the cessation of mining in Geyer. In 1935 it became a nature reserve.

Notable persons

 Kuno Klötzer (1922-2011), football player and coach
 Adam Ries (1492–1559), mathematician, worked as  a tithe collector (Zehentner) from 1533 to 1539 in Geyer
 Hieronymus Lotter (* around 1497 in Nuremberg; † 22 July  1580 in Geyer) 
 Adam Friedrich Zürner (15 August 1679 – 18 December 1742) was a German cartographer and geographer. In the centre of the village is a monument with details of how long it takes to travel to various places in Germany, this was all calculated by Adam Zurner

Albert Zürner (January 30, 1890 – July 18, 1920) was a German diver who competed in the 1906 Summer Olympics, in the 1908 Summer Olympics, and in the 1912 Summer Olympics

Personalities who have worked on the ground

 Evan Evans (1765-1844), English mechanical engineer, builder of the Spinnerei Siebenhöfen, Member of Landtag
 Eric Frenzel (born 1988), Nordic combiner

References 

Erzgebirgskreis
Mining communities in Germany